Riddoch Highway is a rural highway in south-eastern South Australia, designated as route A66 between Keith and Mount Gambier, with the remainder between Mount Gambier and Port MacDonnell designated as route B66. It is named after John Riddoch, the first white settler landholder and vigneron in Coonawarra.

Route
Riddoch Highway branches from Dukes Highway at Keith and travels south through Padthaway, Naracoorte, Penola, Nangwarry, Tarpeena, and Mount Gambier to Port MacDonnell and nearby Cape Northumberland.
It passes through grazing and cereal-growing land, horticultural and vineyards (within the following wine regions - Padthaway, Wrattonbully, Coonawarra and Mount Gambier), and plantation timber, predominantly pinus radiata.

The Royal Automobile Association of South Australia  has rated the highway at 5/10.

Major intersections

See also

 Highways in Australia
 List of highways in South Australia

References

External links
Riddoch Highway webpage on Ozroads website

Highways in South Australia
Roads in South Australia